The Norfolk Southern Tennessee River Bridge is a lift bridge operated by the Norfolk Southern Railway over the Tennessee River at Decatur in the north central part of Alabama in the United States.  While it is owned and operated by Norfolk Southern, the majority of the railroad traffic over the bridge is from another company, CSX Transportation.

There has been a railroad bridge or ferry at this location since the late 1850s. The bridge is on the Norfolk Southern mainline between Sheffield, Alabama and Chattanooga, Tennessee and the CSXT mainline between Birmingham, Alabama and Nashville, Tennessee (S&NA North Subdivision).

This bridge also serves as a vital link between North Alabama and Greater Birmingham/Central Alabama.  The Port of Decatur, which serves as an intramodal terminal for many industries in the region, benefits from the bridge's important location inside Decatur.

References

See also
List of crossings of the Tennessee River

Railroad bridges in Alabama
Decatur, Alabama
Decatur metropolitan area, Alabama
Huntsville-Decatur, AL Combined Statistical Area
Bridges over the Tennessee River
Vertical lift bridges in the United States
Transportation buildings and structures in Morgan County, Alabama
Norfolk Southern Railway bridges
Southern Railway (U.S.)
Towers in Alabama